Frew McMillan and Betty Stöve were the defending champions and successfully defended their title, defeating Billie Jean King and Ray Ruffels in the final, 6–3, 7-6.

Seeds

Draw

Finals

Top half

Section 1

Section 2

Bottom half

Section 3

Section 4

References

External links
1978 US Open – Doubles draws and results at the International Tennis Federation

Mixed Doubles
US Open (tennis) by year – Mixed doubles